The Clarke Studies are a series of pedagogical method books written by Herbert L. Clarke for students of cornet, trumpet, clarinet, and other wind instruments published from 1909 to 1915. Initially intended as a 3-volume series of increasing difficulty, the middle volume titled Clarke's Technical Studies (1912) would gain a following independent of the other volumes, becoming "one of the most widely used trumpet method books" and drawing comparisons to the Arban Method. The Technical Studies were preceded by Elementary Studies (1909) and followed by Characteristic Studies (1915), all originally published by L. B. Clarke of Elkhart, Indiana, later passing to Carl Fischer and other publishers. A fourth work published in 1929 called Setting Up Drills, a short collection of 38 exercises in four groups meant to strengthen the lips and be played for half an hour each day, is sometimes considered part of the series.

Elementary Studies
The first volume, intended for beginners, was published in 1909 as Clarke's Elementary Studies for Cornet. It includes the author's discussions of the positioning of the mouthpiece on the lips, tone, breathing, musical terms, 30 graded lessons, and 116 exercises. The first 35 exercises in the first seven lessons are limited to a single octave, using only whole notes, half notes, and quarter notes. The next 30 exercises in the next seven lessons expand the range on the cornet with a focus on intervals and endurance while introducing eighth notes, dotted notes, and rests rhythmically. This group of lessons ends by introducing accidentals for the chromatic scale. The remaining 51 exercises in the last sixteen lessons introduce sixteenth notes and triplets while visiting all major keys in order of increasing number of flats and sharps. At the end of the thirtieth lesson, there is a 63-measure comprehensive study in  time (  80) and examples of Clarke's exercises for extended range.

Technical Studies
The second volume, published in 1912 as Clarke's Technical Studies for Cornet, includes 190 exercises divided into ten studies with notes from the author suggesting how to practice them. Each of the ten studies concludes with an exercise serving as an étude, except for the ninth study, which lacks an exercise labeled as such, and the tenth study, which ends with two named études. Carl Fischer revised and applied a new copyright to the work in 1984, simplifying the text and adding German and French translations alongside which have been criticized for losing some of the author's philosophy for playing brass.

Characteristic Studies
The third volume, published in 1915 as Clarke's Characteristic Studies for Cornet, contains a "Treatise on Tongueing" about single, double, and triple tongue technique, 24 characteristic studies inspired by violin methods and progressing alternatingly through the major and minor keys chromatically ascending, and 15 solos. It is considered a parallel to the "Characteristic Studies" portion of Arban's Method.

Notes

Music education